NGC 549 is a barred spiral galaxy in the southern constellation Sculptor. It was discovered by British astronomer John Frederick William Herschel on November 29, 1837.

References 

Astronomical objects discovered in 1837
Barred spiral galaxies
Discoveries by John Herschel
549
Sculptor (constellation)